Down by the Racetrack is a 2013 EP by American rock group Guided by Voices. It is the group's first EP since 2002's The Pipe Dreams of Instant Prince Whippet and the first to feature the band's "classic" lineup since 1996's Plantations of Pale Pink.

Track listing

Side A:
 "It Travels Faster Through Thin Hair" - 1:14
 "Pictures of the Man" - 2:37
 "Amanda Gray" - 0:44

Side B:
 "Standing in a Puddle of Flesh" - 1:30
 "Copy Zero" - 1:48
 "Down by the Racetrack" - 1:46

2013 EPs
Guided by Voices EPs